The 1936 All England Championships was a badminton tournament held at the Royal Horticultural Halls, Westminster, England from March 2 to March 7, 1936.

Final results

Results

Men's singles

Women's singles

References

All England Open Badminton Championships
All England
All England Open Badminton Championships in London
1936 in badminton
March 1936 sports events
1936 in London